Marcel Masson (18 November 1899 – 9 April 1976) was a French racing cyclist. He rode in the 1928 Tour de France.

References

1899 births
1976 deaths
French male cyclists
Place of birth missing